Piz Ner is a mountain of the Glarus Alps, located north of Trun in the canton of Graubünden. It lies in the group south of Piz Urlaun.

External links
 Piz Ner on Hikr

References

Mountains of the Alps
Mountains of Graubünden
Mountains of Switzerland